Gianluca Mager was the defending champion but chose not to defend his title.

Facundo Bagnis won the title after Blaž Kavčič retired before the start of the third set, with the first two sets split at 6–7(4–7), 6–4.

Seeds

Draw

Finals

Top half

Bottom half

References

External links
Main draw
Qualifying draw

Thindown Challenger Biella - Singles